Anastasia Pavlyuchenkova was the champion when the event was last held in 2010, but she chose to participate in the Swedish Open instead.

Caroline Wozniacki won the title, defeating Roberta Vinci in the final 6–1, 6–1.

Seeds

Draw

Finals

Top half

Bottom half

Qualifying

Seeds

Qualifiers

Draw

First qualifier

Second qualifier

Third qualifier

Fourth qualifier

Fifth qualifier

Sixth qualifier

References
 Main Draw

İstanbul Cup
Istanbul Cup - Singles